Scout X-2M was an American expendable launch system which was flown three times between May 1962 and April 1963. It was a four-stage rocket, based on the earlier Scout X-2, but with an MG-18 upper stage instead of the Altair used on the X-2. It was a member of the Scout family of rockets.

The Scout X-2 was an all-solid rocket, with an Algol 1D first stage, a Castor 1A second stage, an Antares 2A third stage, and an MG-18 fourth stage. It was launched from Launch Complex D at Point Arguello, and was used for the launch of P-35 weather satellites.

The first Scout X-2M was launched 24 May 1962, carrying P35-1, but failed to reach orbit. The second flight, launched at 11:44 GMT on 23 August, was the only successful launch to be made by an X-2M, placing P35-2 into low Earth orbit. The final launch, with P35-4 occurred on 26 April 1963, and like the first flight, it failed to reach orbit.

References

 

1962 in spaceflight
1963 in spaceflight
X-2